, also known as  for short, is a Japanese light novel series written by Kimihito Irie, with illustrations by Shino. Fujimi Shobo has published nine volumes since January 2010 under their Fujimi Fantasia Bunko imprint. A manga adaptation by Abaraheiki began serialization in the November 2010 issue of Fujimi Shobo's Monthly Dragon Age. A drama CD was released by Marine Entertainment on December 29, 2010. A 12-episode anime television series adaptation produced by Madhouse and directed by Yūji Kumazawa, aired between July and September 2013.

Plot
The story is set in a fictional world, where, fifteen years earlier, human beings lost the ability to have children and to truly die. Those who have died continue to exist, regardless of injury and decay. According to legend, God abandoned his creations but left them one final gift in the form of "gravekeepers," strange individuals with the ability to give rest to the living dead. Twelve-year-old Ai is one such gravekeeper. Her life changes forever when an immortal gunslinger named Hampnie Hambart massacres the residents of her small village. With no place to go, Ai is forced to rely on Hampnie, and she comes to learn the truth about him and her village.

Afterward, she sets out on a journey, performing her duties as a gravekeeper and striving to learn more about why the world has fallen into such a state, and she declares her desire to save the world God has abandoned. While on her journey, she encounters new people: Hampnie's childhood friend Julie, the gravekeeper Scar, a mysterious boy named Alice, and a ghostly witch named Dee.

Characters

Main characters

Ai is the main character and a twelve-year-old gravekeeper, taking on the job after her mother died. She is quite naïve but cares a lot about others. According to her late mother, her father was called Hampnie Hambart, and when she meets a man by that name, he claims he never had a daughter, and after encountering him she learns that all the villagers in her life were actually deceased and that Hampnie is her father. As the child of a gravekeeper and a human, Ai is arguably the last child born in the world, where ordinary children stopped being conceived three years before her birth. This and the fact that she has emotions is what makes her different from the other gravekeepers. She desires to save the world God has supposedly abandoned and leaves her village to set out on a journey.

 

Upon arrival, he proceeds to shoot everyone in the village, sparing only Ai. Hampnie's goal in traveling is to find a woman named Hana. He became immortal fifteen years ago when God abandoned the world, and can regenerate after being injured. Although he has a cold personality, he claims to only use his gun in self-defense or to destroy the bodies of those who already died, as according to him, the dead have no place among the living. His wish was to die happily beside his family, and it is realized when he learns that Ai is his daughter with Hana after being tortured to death by Hiko and his gang. After awakening as an undead, Hampnie is buried by Ai beside Hana's grave at his request.

 
 
An emotionless and skilled gravekeeper with no actual name, and she passes by Ai's village in search of the "dead". She eventually joins Ai on her journey. As the group stops over at Ortus, she also saves Ulla's older sister Celica, a baby frozen in time, and adopts her as a daughter. Scar begins to show more emotions when Julie vows to take care of her, having wished to become human while at Story Circle, a birthplace for gravekeepers.

 
Hampnie's childhood friend. Julie hid his wife away from the gravekeepers after she died due to illness to prevent her burial. Hampnie caught up to him and destroyed her body, and after the death of his child, he seeks revenge against Hampnie, although Hampnie claims that Julie, knowing of Hampnie's immortality, is actually suicidal and desires to be killed by him. After Hampnie is put to rest, Julie starts traveling alongside Ai and Scar, and later bonds with Scar as they care for baby Celica together.

A young boy Ai meets while at Goran Academy, and he seems to have an interest in her. Despite having the same wish as Ai, he wants to save his world by destroying it. He also has a special ability "Buzzer Beater" that allows him to hit any targets that he shoots. Alice and Dee are first seen observing Ai in Ortus, and later they join Ai on her journey, and he invites Ai and the others to a desolated town, Ostia, and they enter into the world of Class 3-4. Fourteen years ago, while preparing for their school's cultural festival, Dee fell from a window and Alice rescued her, and he ended up falling from the window instead, which resulted in his death. This caused Class 3-4 to make a wish for their happy days to be eternal and as a result, it created a delusional world that resets about once every year on July 28, and Alice wants to save his classmates who are trapped by destroying the false world. Due to Alice being dead and his body having been buried by a gravekeeper and thus not being bound to the sealed city like the rest of his classmates, he has a physical form outside the sealed city, unlike Dee, who is forced to take a ghostly form. He is saved at the end of the anime series by Ai, who wished she could save him from perishing. He grows close to Ai over the course of the series, encouraging her in her goal to save the world.

A female ghost is known as the "Witch of the West" who travels the world helping or giving people advice and information, secretly whispering to others and compelling them, and she accompanies Alice in his quest to save their world of Class 3-4. In the sealed city of Ostia, Dee regains her physical form, as her physical body is trapped within the seal. While searching for the answer to the time loop Class 3-4 is trapped in, Dee found a newspaper said that one student from Ostia died while sixteen others went missing. There she remembered that Alice died while saving her from falling out a window, and thus the rest of Class 3-4 wished the incident had never happened and their peaceful days could last forever. She prevents Alice from finding a way to free Class 3-4 so that she can stay with him forever, leading Ai to believe she is in love with Alice.

Ortus

 
An apprentice at a government office in Ortus, a city for the deceased. He was first found asleep in Julie's van while Julie, Ai, and Scar are on their journey. He is also close to Princess Ulla, being a schoolmate and a teacher to her. He is actually made of body parts from five people, born from their wishes of having a child being granted by a witch. He also ages much slower than a normal human and has knowledge from the minds of the five people he was made from. He is devoted to Ulla and has deep feelings for her.

Princess of Ortus, also known as the Idol of Murder. Her eyes are blindfolded and her body is fully clothed. Just before her birth, she had accepted her mother's wish to kill all human beings before her death, and anybody that she sees, speaks to or touches will be killed by her thus, preventing her to have normal interaction with the living. She instead writes down her thoughts or uses Kiriko as a communication medium. Even when Ai tells her the truth of her powers, she is still happy in Ortus, and she cares for Kiriko greatly.

 

The ambassador of special foreign affairs of Ortus. One of the five people Kiriko was made from.

The vice-captain of the Ortus Imperial Guard. One of the five people Kiriko was made from.

The royal doctor of Ortus. One of the five people Kiriko was made from.

Goran Academy

A student at Goran Academy, a school for children with special powers and from which they are not allowed to leave. Tanya was born blind but due to her wish she has the ability to use "Spirit Vision," which allows her to hear the sounds of places and things, and can even sense the shape of color. After escaping Goran Academy, she allows the other students to stay at her parents' household until they decide what to do furthermore.

A student at Goran Academy. Volrath possesses excessive destructive strength.

A student at Goran Academy who is also Volrath's boyfriend. He has the ability to consume inorganic materials for his own sustenance.

A student at Goran Academy. His age is actually twenty-two, but since he has been asleep for ten years, he has the appearance of a twelve-year-old boy.

Twin students at Goran Academy. Mimi is the first daughter, and Meme is the second daughter. Claiming to not be actual twins, but have multiple personalities, due to the third sister, Momo, who died and later buried by a gravekeeper, and who remains alive within them. They were born into a noble family.

A student at Goran Academy, and she can breathe underwater. She wants to go to an underwater city called Espia.

An instructor at Goran Academy. She is stern and disciplines students with her revolvers.

Minor characters
 
, Yūko Gotō (drama CD)
The woman Hampnie Hambart is searching for. Hampnie describes her as someone who is quite sensitive, loves eating, and light-brown hair. She is eventually revealed to be the same person as Alfa, Ai's mother, and the first gravekeeper. Hana's dream was to have the world turn into a place for Heaven and then passed it down to Ai. She died when Ai was seven years old.

 & 
Yōki: 
Anna: 
A married couple in Ai's village who acted as Ai's foster parents.

A blacksmith in Ai's village.

An undead who obsesses over Hampnie.

Media

Light novels
Kami-sama no Inai Nichiyōbi began as a light novel series written by Kimihito Irie, with illustrations by Shino. Irie entered the first novel in the series, originally titled , in Fujimi Shobo's 21st Fantasia Prize in 2009 and the novel won the Grand Prize. The first novel was published by Fujimi Shobo on January 20, 2010 under their Fujimi Fantasia Bunko imprint, and the ninth and final volume was released on May 20, 2014.

Novel list

Manga
A manga adaptation illustrated by Abaraheiki was serialized between the November 2010 and August 2013 issues of Fujimi Shobo's Monthly Dragon Age, sold between October 9, 2010 and July 9, 2013, comprising 28 chapters, and it covers the events of the first novel. Four tankōbon volumes were released between June 7, 2011 and August 9, 2013.

Volume list

Anime

A 12-episode anime television series adaptation, produced by Madhouse and directed by Yūji Kumazawa aired between July 6 and September 21, 2013. Crunchyroll streamed the series in North America with English subtitles. An original video animation episode included on the fifth Blu-ray was originally scheduled for release on January 22, 2014, but was delayed to February 5, 2014. The anime has been licensed by Sentai Filmworks in North America, and was also streamed on Anime Network.

Soundtrack
The background music for the anime was composed by Hiromi Mizutani, and the original soundtrack, titled Requiem, was released by King Records on September 25, 2013. The first printing of the original soundtrack also included an image song titled "Hohoemi no Ame" for Ai Astin, sung by her voice actress Aki Toyosaki.

Notes

References

External links
 Kami-sama no Inai Nichiyōbi at Fujimi Shobo 
 Drama CD official website 
 Anime official website 
 Sunday Without God at Anime Network
 

2010s fantasy novels
2010 Japanese novels
Anime and manga based on light novels
Fujimi Fantasia Bunko
Fujimi Shobo manga
Kadokawa Dwango franchises
Japanese fantasy novels
Light novels
Madhouse (company)
Mystery anime and manga
Romance anime and manga
Sentai Filmworks
Shōnen manga
Supernatural anime and manga
Television shows based on light novels
Zombies in anime and manga
Tokyo MX original programming